Scott Kroopf (born June 20, 1951) is an American film producer. He studied at the University of California with Bachelor of Arts degree in drama.

Filmography
All films, he was producer unless otherwise noted.

Film

Miscellaneous crew

Thanks

Television

References

External links

1951 births
Living people
American film producers
University of California alumni